The Hartford Hawks are the NCAA Division I athletic teams of the University of Hartford, located in West Hartford, Connecticut. Hartford sponsors teams in eight men's and nine women's NCAA sanctioned sports. The men's and women's tennis teams were discontinued at the end of the 2016 season, and women's lacrosse was added.

Overview 

On May 6, 2021, the University of Hartford Board of Regents voted to drop its athletic department to Division III. This plan will start with the university's formal application to the NCAA for reclassification in January 2022. Starting in 2022–23, Hartford would no longer award athletic scholarships to incoming students, and begin playing as a Division I independent. In 2023–24, the school plans to become a provisional member of a Division III conference, and transition all remaining student-athletes off athletic aid by the end of that school year. It was later announced on June 21, 2022 that the Hawks would be joining the Commonwealth Coast Conference. Hartford would become a full D-III member on September 1, 2025.

Sports sponsored

Men's golf

Women's golf

Men's soccer

Women's soccer

Volleyball

Discontinued sports

Men's tennis

Athletic facilities

Academics
From Hartford's athletic website: "Hartford, which has posted a combined GPA of 3.0 or higher in each of the last 15 semesters, saw an average of 70 percent of its student-athletes record a 3.0 in one or both semesters last year. In addition, 43 percent of Hawk student-athletes notched at least a 3.5 while five percent registered perfect 4.0 GPA's for the 2012–13 academic year." "The University of Hartford clinched its second-straight America East Academic Cup in 2012–13 after posting the highest grade-point average of any school in the 18-year history of the award. Compiling a 3.24 GPA in 2012–13, the Hawks won their third Academic Cup all-time."

Mascot and nickname
From Hartford's athletic website: "Howie is well known among the University of Hartford community and fans, and has been known for his on court antics during basketball games. The current version of Howie the Hawk began its tenure during the winter of 2008–09." "The nickname originated in the late 1940s when the school competed as Hillyer College. It is believed that the nickname stemmed from spectators having to climb four flights of stairs in the old Chauncey Harris School on Hudson Street in Hartford to the "Hawk's Nest" to watch basketball and wrestling events."

Notable Hawks
Jeff Bagwell – Former Hartford third baseman (1987–89). 2x All-American (1988, 1989), 2x Eastern College Athletic Conference (ECAC) Player of the Year (1988, 1989). Hartford's all-time leader in batting average and slugging percentage. Selected as the 110th overall pick in the 4th round of the 1989 MLB draft by the Boston Red Sox (1989–90). Traded to the Houston Astros (1990–2005) on August 30, 1990. NL MVP (1994), 4x MLB All-Star (1994, 1996, 1997, 1999), NL Rookie of the Year (1991), Gold Glove Award (1994), 3x Silver Slugger (1994, 1997, 1999). Former Houston Astros hitting coach (2010), Major League Baseball Hall of Fame, Cooperstown, NY, inducted (2017).
Vin Baker — Former Hartford center (1989–93). North Atlantic Conference (NAC) Player of the Year (1992–93). Hartford's all-time leading scorer. Selected as the 8th overall pick in the 1st round of the 1993 NBA draft by the Milwaukee Bucks (1993–97). Seattle SuperSonics (1997–02), Boston Celtics (2002–04), New York Knicks (2004–05), Houston Rockets (2005), Los Angeles Clippers (2006), Minnesota Timberwolves (2006). 4x NBA All-Star (1994–95, 1995–96, 1996–97, 1997–98). All-NBA Second Team (1997–98). All-NBA Third Team (1996–97). NBA All-Rookie First Team (1993–94).
Jerry Kelly
Tracey Kelusky
Tim Petrovic 
Patrick Sheehan
Saralyn Smith
Earl Snyder — Former Hartford first/third baseman (1995–98). Hartford's all-time leader in hits, runs, home runs, runs batted in (RBIs), and total bases.
Sean Newcomb — Former Hartford starting pitcher (2012–14). Baseball America All-American Third Team (2014), ABCA All-American Second Team (2014), Perfect Game All-American Second Team (2014). ABCA All-Northeast Region First Team (2014). America East Pitcher of the Year (2014). Selected 15th overall in the 1st round of the 2014 Major League Baseball draft by the Los Angeles Angels of Anaheim (2014–2015) before being traded to the Atlanta Braves whom he would make his MLB debut with in 2017. As of 2023, he is currently a member of the San Francisco Giants.

Athletic directors
Peter A. LoMaglio 
Gordon McCullough (1974-1986)
Pat Meiser (1993–2014)
Anton Goff (2014–2016)
Mary Ellen Gillespie (2017–2019)
Maria Feeley (interim) (2019–2021)
Dr. Sharon Beverly (2021–present)

Notes

References

External links